Adventuredome (formerly Grand Slam Canyon) is a  indoor amusement park at Circus Circus in Winchester, Nevada on the Las Vegas Strip. It is owned by Phil Ruffin. It is contained within a large glass dome, and offers various rides and attractions including the Canyon Blaster and El Loco roller coasters, a rock climbing wall, an 18-hole miniature golf course, a video game arcade, and carnival-type games. Because the park is enclosed, it is unaffected by weather, unlike most theme parks, and is open year-round. Every October from 2003 until 2017, the Adventuredome was turned into the Halloween-themed Fright Dome.

The theme park opened as Grand Slam Canyon on August 23, 1993, in the west parking lot of the hotel. After customer feedback, the park was closed for 45 days in 1994 to add new attractions. Grand Slam Canyon was renamed the Adventuredome in 1997.

Circus Circus Enterprises (later Mandalay Resort Group) initially owned the Adventuredome until 2005, when it was sold to MGM Mirage, which later became MGM Resorts International. Ruffin purchased the resort and theme park in 2019.

History

Circus Circus Enterprises announced the theme park on August 26, 1992, as an addition to its Circus Circus Las Vegas resort. The Grand Slam Canyon, themed after the Grand Canyon, would be built west of the casino, on a deck located above a parking lot. Veldon Simpson was the architect, and Arrow Dynamics was hired to design and build several of the rides. Perini Corporation was hired to construct the dome itself. The park cost $90 million to build.

Construction was underway in September 1992, and the opening was initially scheduled for the following July. Circus Circus hoped to have the Grand Slam Canyon opened before the upcoming MGM Grand Adventures Theme Park.
The dome has 8,615 panes of glass.

Grand Slam Canyon eventually opened on August 23, 1993. It featured river-rapid rides, two lagoonlike pools, a lazy creek and a re-creation of a pueblo. It had four attractions: the Canyon Blaster roller coaster, the Twist 'N' Shout water raft, the Rim Runner, and the Hot Shotz Lazer Tag arena, now known as Lazer Blast. The park also featured eight large animatronic dinosaurs spread throughout the park, with visitors being able to read the informational placards in front of each one. Though visitors could not ride them, the dinosaurs often "interacted" with the visitors, with some spitting water on guests.

Grand Slam Canyon was initially popular, but visitors often expressed their desire for more things to do. Tom Nolan, the vice president of theme park operations at Adventuredome, suggested that "it was a [matter] of what people wanted versus what they could do" and added that "there were a lot of animatronics, a lot of theming, but people said there weren't enough things to do." Following the feedback, the park was closed for 45 days beginning in April 1994 to remodel, adding $15 million in new attractions. The park originally charged a $10 admission fee, but this was dropped in favor of a $2.50 fee for each ride.

During the remodeling, several family-friendly attractions were added, such as Midway shows, Canyon Cars (bumper cars), Sand Pirates (a swinging pirate ship), Miner Mike (a mini roller coaster), Thunderbirds (a mini airplane ride), and Drifters (a mini Ferris wheel). The Twist 'N' Shout water raft ride was removed to make way for several of these rides, solely due to its size. After the remodeling, as space became available, rides were added to the theme park one or two at a time every few years. Near the laser tag arena, for example, management added a rock climbing wall and a miniature golf course. Though initially hesitant to add the golf course out of concern for the park's glass dome, there has not been a single golf ball incident as of 2009. The animatronic dinosaurs were eventually removed.

In its early years, the park was sometimes also known as "Grand Slam Canyon Adventuredome". The name was changed to simply "Adventuredome" in 1997. The theme park is climate-controlled, and this helped it succeed over its rival, MGM Grand Adventures, which was outdoors and struggled during the hot summer months in Las Vegas. The Adventuredome also competed against the nearby Wet 'n Wild water park.

The Adventuredome began offering IMAX film rides in 1998, including one based on the animated series ReBoot. In 1999, management tried to keep up with the latest developments in the industry by consulting visitor surveys. This resulted in the addition of several dynamic thrill rides across the next few years, including the Inverter that same year, Chaos in 2001, and the Sling Shot in 2004. The new rides were part of an effort to target an older demographic, from ages 13 and up. 

On February 3, 2013, the Rim Runner was permanently closed to make way for a newer roller coaster named "El Loco", which opened on February 18, 2014. The Rim Runner's closure left the Canyon Blaster as the only original ride left from the park's opening.

Phil Ruffin purchased Circus Circus and the Adventuredome from MGM Resorts International in 2019.

Aside from rides, the Adventuredome also includes midway and arcade games.

Attendance
The park received its 1-millionth guest in May 1994, and its 10-millionth in July 1998. At that time, the park averaged two million visitors a year. A record for daily attendance was hit on November 27, 1999, with 30,130 visitors. For 2000, the Adventuredome ranked 19th in North America and 34th in the world for attendance, with 2.9 million visitors. As of 2001, the park received an average of 7,500 visitors daily. For 2003, park attendance ranked 11th in North America and 19th in the world. The park had received 30 million total visitors as of 2004. Another single-day record was reached in November 2005, with 41,182 people. The Adventuredome had its 50 millionth visitor on January 1, 2009. Attendance was 3.2 million people for 2014.

Fright Dome
In 2003, the Adventuredome partnered with brothers Jason and Michael Egan, who owned Fright America, to transform the theme park into a temporary Halloween attraction known as Fright Dome. The project, modeled after Knott's Scary Farm, was intended to boost attendance during October, which was usually a poor month for visitation as children return to school. Fright Dome included haunted houses and actors in costumes. Nine of the theme park's rides, aimed at younger children, were closed during the Fright Dome event, in an effort to appeal to an older demographic.

Fright Dome became an annual event at the Adventuredome each October. It cost $2 million to put on each year. New features were added for each Fright Dome. In 2005, it attracted 50,000 visitors. USA Today considered Fright Dome to be among the top 10 haunted house attractions in the U.S. In 2014, the Travel Channel ranked Fright Dome as the second best haunted attraction in the country, and another location was opened that year in Hong Kong.

Fright Dome was sometimes themed after horror films, including The Texas Chain Saw Massacre (1974), and the Halloween and Saw films. The 2016 event included a haunted house based on Five Nights at Freddy's.

The 2017 Fright Dome would be the last, as Circus Circus announced that it would not bring back the event for 2018.

Rides and attractions
The current and former attractions at the amusement park are provided below.

Current

Coasters

Premium rides

Large rides

Junior rides

Family rides

Former

In popular culture
 In the 1999 film Baby Geniuses, the Adventuredome makes an appearance as the fictional "Joyworld" theme park. Sly starts the Canyon Blaster ride with two scientists on board and restraints still open. Both fall from the ride.
 In the season 3 episode "Rollercoaster Thru Criss" from the TV series Criss Angel Mindfreak, a train "goes through" Criss' body while he stands on the track of the Canyon Blaster ride after the corkscrews, and Criss ends up in the front seat.

Notes

References

External links
 
 
 Official Fright Dome website
 

1993 establishments in Nevada
Amusement parks in Nevada
Amusement parks opened in 1993
Buildings and structures in Winchester, Nevada
Indoor amusement parks
Las Vegas Strip
Mandalay Resort Group
Tourist attractions in the Las Vegas Valley